The Dominican Republic became independent from Spain in 1865 and produced its own stamps from that date.

Gallery of stamps of the Dominican Republic

See also
Postage stamps and postal history of Haiti

References

Communications in the Dominican Republic
Dominican Republic
History of the Dominican Republic